Dasht Jeyhun (also Romanized as Dasht Jeyḩūn; also known as Jaihūn, and Jeyḩūn) is a village in Kohurestan Rural District, in the Central District of Khamir County, Hormozgan Province, Iran. At the 2006 census, its population was 245, in 44 families.

References 

Populated places in Khamir County